The Black Gold Stakes at Fair Grounds Race Course in New Orleans, Louisiana is a race on turf for three-year-old Thoroughbred horses. First run in 1958, the race is named in honor of the 1924 Kentucky Derby winner and U. S. Racing Hall of Fame stallion Black Gold. It is tradition that the winning jockey of the race places flowers on the horse's grave in the infield.

Historical notes
Through 1978 the race was open to horses age three and older.

Run on turf in 1998, 2000-2004, 2008-2009, 2012-2016, 2018. Scheduled to run on turf in 1999 and 2005 though 2007 but weather conditions can affect the safety of the turf and as such each of the races was switched to the dirt track .

In 2006, the Black Gold Stakes was run at Louisiana Downs in Bossier City, Louisiana.

Race distances
6 F : 1958-1997, 2011
5.5 F : 1998-2000, 2007-2010
7.5 F : 2001-2004, 2012-2013, 2015-2016
8 F (1 mile) : 2005, 2018
8.32 F (1 mile, 70 yards) : 2006

Records
Speed record: (at most frequent distance of 6 furlongs)
1:09.40 - Smoke Glacken (1997)

Most wins:
 3 - Honey Jay (1972, 1973, 1974)

Most wins by a jockey:
 4 - Robby Albarado (2005, 2006, 2007, 2016)

Most wins by a trainer:
 4 - Jack Van Berg (1965, 1966, 1967, 1971)

Most wins by an owner:
 4 - Marion Van Berg (1965, 1966, 1967, 1971)

Winners

References

Fair Grounds Race Course
Ungraded stakes races in the United States
Horse races in New Orleans
Horse racing
Open mile category horse races
Open sprint category horse races
Recurring sporting events established in 1958
1958 establishments in Louisiana